Stigmella progama is a species of moth in the family Nepticulidae. This species is endemic to New Zealand. It is classified as "Data Deficient" by the Department of Conservation. S. progama has only been collected on Bold Peak in Otago.

Taxonomy 
This species was described by Edward Meyrick in 1924 using a female specimen collected by George Hudson at Bold Peak in the Humboldt Mountains. Meyrick named the species Nepticula progama. Hudson discussed and illustrated the species under that name in his 1928 publication The Butterflies and Moths of New Zealand. In 1988 John S. Dugdale assigned this species to the genus Stigmella. The holotype specimen is held at the Natural History Museum, London.

Description 
Meyrick described this species as follows:

Distribution 
This species is endemic to New Zealand. It has only been found in its type locality in the Humboldt Mountains in Otago at approximately 1200 m. above sea-level.

Biology and behaviour 
Adults of this species are on the wing in January. The male of the species has yet to be collected.

Conservation status 
This species has been classified as having the "Data Deficient" conservation status under the New Zealand Threat Classification System.

References

External links

Image of holotype specimen

Nepticulidae
Moths of New Zealand
Taxa named by Edward Meyrick
Endemic fauna of New Zealand
Moths described in 1924
Endemic moths of New Zealand